Cuiciuna amoenoides is a species of beetle in the family Cerambycidae. It was described by Fisher in 1938. It is known from Brazil.

References

Hemilophini
Beetles described in 1938